André Anthony Anderson (born May 1, 1988) is a former American football running back. He played his college football at Tulane.

Professional career 
Anderson went undrafted in the 2010 NFL Draft. On April 24, Anderson signed a contract with the Buffalo Bills. He was cut by the Bills during final cuts on September 4, 2010 but was re-signed to their practice squad on September 21, 2010. On October 6, 2010, Anderson was promoted to the Bills' 53-man active roster.

References

External links 

 Tulane Green Wave football bio
 Seattle Seahawks bio

1988 births
Living people
Players of American football from Fort Lauderdale, Florida
American football running backs
Tulane Green Wave football players
Buffalo Bills players
Seattle Seahawks players